Christoffer Aasbak (born 22 July 1993) is a Norwegian footballer who plays for Kristiansund.

Career statistics

Club

References

1993 births
Living people
Norwegian footballers
Ranheim Fotball players
Kristiansund BK players
Byåsen Toppfotball players
IL Hødd players
Norwegian First Division players
Eliteserien players
Association football midfielders
Footballers from Trondheim